Joseph "Joey" Mawson (born 27 March 1996 in Sydney) is a professional racing driver from Australia, who is the current double champion of the Australian S5000 Championship.

Career
Mawson started his career in karting at the age of 7, and soon began to dominate the Junior karting scene, winning 19 state and 3 national titles between 2003 and 2012. He also finished 2nd in the Junior Max category at the 2011 Rotax World Championships, and was named Australia's best karter in 2010 by various media.

Open Wheel
He made his open-wheel debut in French F4 in 2014, qualifying on pole and winning on debut at the inaugural round at the Bugatti Circuit. He completed all but the final round of the season, finishing 4th having amassed 188 points along with 3 wins. In 2015 he moved to ADAC Formula 4 where he joined Van Amersfoort Racing alongside Harrison Newey and Mick Schumacher. Despite the pressure from his highly rated teammates he beat them both in the championship, finishing 3rd with 5 wins, finishing 2 points shy of 2nd place.

In 2016, he remained with VAR in ADAC Formula 4. He won 10 out of 24 races on his way to the title, beating now Prema driver Schumacher by 52 points. As a result, he was given the opportunity test one of VAR's European F3 cars at Monza, managing to trade fastest laps with Lando Norris.

In 2017, Mawson graduated to European Formula 3, whilst continuing his collaboration with VAR. However, he struggled throughout the season, finishing only thirteenth in the standings with one podium finish at the Nürburgring.

In 2018, Mawson is contesting the final season of the GP3 Series with Arden International. He finished the season thirteenth with two podiums. One each in France and Russia.

Porsche Cup
In 2019 he started his Porsche Carrera Cup career. Firstly starting in Australia, then Supercup with Team Australia. Later in 2019, we started his first Porsche Carrera Cup Germany race.

Racing record

Career summary

* Season still in progress.
‡ Guest driver. Not eligible for points.

Complete French F4 Championship results 
(key) (Races in bold indicate pole position) (Races in italics indicate fastest lap)

Complete ADAC Formula 4 Championship results 
(key) (Races in bold indicate pole position) (Races in italics indicate fastest lap)

Complete FIA Formula 3 European Championship results
(key) (Races in bold indicate pole position) (Races in italics indicate fastest lap)

Complete GP3 Series results
(key) (Races in bold indicate pole position) (Races in italics indicate fastest lap)

† — Drivers did not finish the race, but were classified as they completed over 90% of the race distance.
‡ — Set fastest lap, but not awarded as finished outside of points position.

Complete Porsche Supercup results
(key) (Races in bold indicate pole position) (Races in italics indicate fastest lap)

† Race shortened. No points awarded.

Complete S5000 results

* Season still in progress.

Complete Bathurst 12 Hour results

References

External links

1996 births
Living people
Racing drivers from Sydney
Karting World Championship drivers
French F4 Championship drivers
ADAC Formula 4 drivers
ADAC Formula 4 champions
MRF Challenge Formula 2000 Championship drivers
FIA Formula 3 European Championship drivers
Australian GP3 Series drivers
Formula Regional European Championship drivers
Arden International drivers
Porsche Supercup drivers
Van Amersfoort Racing drivers
Auto Sport Academy drivers
BRDC British Formula 3 Championship drivers
Euroformula Open Championship drivers
BVM Racing drivers
Tasman Series drivers